Arthur Eugene Bestor (1879 – February 3, 1944) was an educator. He served as the President of Chautauqua Institution in Chautauqua, New York, from 1915 to his death in 1944.

Biography

Early life
Arthur Eugene Bestor was born in 1879 in Dixon, Illinois.

Career
Bestor became assistant director of the Chautauqua Institution in 1905. Two years later, in 1907, he became director. Since 1915, he served as the President of Chautauqua Institution in Chautauqua, New York, until 1944. He was a proponent of adult education. Under his twenty-nine year administration, the Institution grew from an assembly for teachers and ministers with modest facilities to a wide-ranging summer program with a symphony orchestra, an opera company, a resident repertory theater company, and celebrated lecturers.

Personal life
He was married to Jeanette Lemon. They had three children:
Arthur E. Bestor Jr. He was a distinguished professor of American intellectual and constitutional history, and an important critic of American educational practices. 
Mary Francis Bestor Cram. She was a leader of lay organizations in the American Baptist Church and the Young Women's Christian Association, serving as president of the U.S. organization.
Charles Lemon Bestor. He was a composer of contemporary classical music, a music educator, and professor of music (emeritus) at the University of Massachusetts, Amherst.

Death
He died on February 3, 1944, in New York City.

References

1879 births
1944 deaths
Educators from New York City